Distinguishable may refer to:
Distinguishing attack in cryptography
Identical particles in statistical mechanics
Clear enough to be recognized or identified as different.

See also
 Distinction (disambiguation)